The 1915 Spring Hill Badgers football team represented the Spring Hill College as an independent during the 1915 college football season.

Schedule

References

Spring Hill
Spring Hill Badgers football seasons
Spring Hill Badgers football